Renovación Nacional may refer to:

 National Renewal (Chile)
 National Renewal (Peru)